Francis Raymond Blades (August 6, 1896 – May 18, 1979) was an American left fielder, manager, coach and scout in Major League Baseball (MLB).

Scouted on the sandlots by Rickey
A native of McLeansboro, Illinois, Blades was first scouted as a baseball player as a teenager in 1913. Branch Rickey, then the manager of the St. Louis Browns, spotted Blades during a sandlot game for the St. Louis city championship.  Seven years would pass, however, before Rickey would sign Blades to a contract; by that time, 1920, however, Rickey was working for the Browns’ National League rivals, the St. Louis Cardinals.

After apprenticing in the minor leagues, Blades reached the Cardinals in 1922. Hampered by a severe knee injury, he appeared in over 100 games only three times – from 1924 to 1926 – but he hung on as a spare outfielder for ten major league seasons (1922–28; 1930–32), all with the Cardinals, and batted .301 lifetime. In his finest season, 1925, he hit .342 in 462 at-bats. He appeared in three World Series (1928, 1930 and 1931). Beginning a transition to a management career, he was a playing coach for the Cardinals from 1930 to 1932.

Manager, coach and scout
Blades was known as a ferocious competitor with a terrible temper, and he carried that reputation with him as a manager in the Cardinals’ farm system. He managed at the top level of the St. Louis organization with the Rochester Red Wings and Columbus Red Birds from 1933 to 1938 and was named skipper of the Cardinals in 1939.

Upon his appointment, he prohibited alcohol drinking among his players. In his first season, the Cards responded to Blades’ tough regimen, winning 92 games and improving from sixth to second place in the National League. But the Cardinals slumped in the early weeks of 1940, winning only 14 of their first 38 games and plunging back into sixth place. On June 7, Blades was fired and ultimately replaced by Billy Southworth.

He then coached in the National League for the Cincinnati Reds (1942), Brooklyn Dodgers (1947–48) and Chicago Cubs (1953–56), in addition to a one-year return to the Cardinals (1951). He managed again in minor league baseball, spending two non-consecutive years (1941 and 1943) as skipper of the New Orleans Pelicans and three seasons (1944–46) at the helm of the St. Paul Saints, which then was one of the Dodgers' two top-level farm teams.  He also worked in Brooklyn's farm system as a managerial consultant (1949–50) and scouted for the Cubs from 1957 into the early 1960s.

Rejected Dodger interim post in 1947
After 1940, Blades never managed again full-time in the big leagues, although during his tenure with Brooklyn he and a fellow coach, Clyde Sukeforth, turned down the job as acting manager of the 1947 Dodgers after the suspension of Leo Durocher for the season. Rickey, by then president of the Dodgers, ultimately turned to Burt Shotton, one of the team's scouts, and under Shotton Brooklyn won the 1947 NL pennant. During the following year, Blades served as interim Dodger pilot for a single game, when Durocher left Brooklyn for the New York Giants job, and Shotton succeeded him a second time. The Dodgers won Blades' one game at the helm, 4–2, on July 16, 1948, against the Reds. His final record as a big-league manager was 107–85 (.557).

Ray Blades died in Lincoln, Illinois at the age of 82 in 1979.

See also
List of St. Louis Cardinals managers
List of St. Louis Cardinals coaches
List of Major League Baseball players who spent their entire career with one franchise

References
The St. Louis Star-Times, 1938.
J. G. Taylor Spink, ed., The Baseball Register, 1956 edition. St. Louis: C.C. Spink & Son.

External links

1896 births
1979 deaths
Baseball players from Illinois
Brooklyn Dodgers coaches
Brooklyn Dodgers managers
Chicago Cubs coaches
Chicago Cubs scouts
Cincinnati Reds coaches
Columbus Red Birds players
Houston Buffaloes players
Major League Baseball left fielders
Memphis Chickasaws players
Minor league baseball managers
People from McLeansboro, Illinois
Rochester Red Wings managers
Rochester Red Wings players
St. Louis Cardinals coaches
St. Louis Cardinals managers
St. Louis Cardinals players
St. Paul Saints (AA) managers